James "Jimmy" Howlett, also known as Logan or by his codename, The Wolverine, is a fictional character originating as the primary protagonist of 20th Century Fox's X-Men film series, and appearing in the Marvel Cinematic Universe (MCU) media franchise produced by Marvel Studios. He is portrayed by Hugh Jackman and based on the Marvel Comics character Wolverine, created by Roy Thomas, Len Wein and John Romita Sr.

Logan has been the central figure of the film series, having appeared in nine films since his introduction in X-Men (2000).
The character and Jackman's performance have been credited with helping to cement the series as a multi-billion-dollar franchise, with Logan's appearance often being considered the face of the X-Men.

For his portrayal of Logan, Jackman held the Guinness World Record of the "longest career as a live-action Marvel character," alongside Patrick Stewart, until this was later surpassed by Tobey Maguire and Willem Dafoe who reprised their roles of Peter Parker / Spider-Man and Norman Osborn /  Green Goblin from Sam Raimi's Spider-Man trilogy in the MCU film Spider-Man: No Way Home in 2021, though Stewart alone would retake the title later in 2022 following his appearance in Doctor Strange in the Multiverse of Madness. Jackman is set to return to reprise the role in Deadpool 3 (2024), produced by Marvel Studios and set in the MCU, surpassing Stewart yet again.

Fictional character biography

Early life 

James Howlett was born in Canada in 1832. His mutant powers are awakened when, at 13, he stabs his family's groundskeeper for killing his father. Discovering that the groundskeeper was in fact his biological father and seeing the revulsion in his mother's eyes over James killing him, James flees. With his half-brother Victor Creed, Howlett spends the next century fighting in numerous wars including the Second World War. While held in a Japanese POW camp in 1945, he saves the life of Japanese officer Ichirō Yashida from the bombing of Nagasaki. In 1962, Howlett is approached by Charles Xavier and Erik Lehnsherr, who are recruiting mutants. Howlett instead tells Xavier and Lehnsherr to "Go fuck yoursel[ves]".

Original timeline

Team X and Becoming the Wolverine 

After the Vietnam War, he becomes a member of a black-ops strike team "Team X", led by Colonel William Stryker, after he protects Victor for killing a superior officer who had tried to stop him killing a villager, before leaving due to the group's disregard for life. However, Howlett's past catches up to him in Canada where he is living under the name "Logan", despite his relationship with Kayla Silverfox, with both the Weapon X project in which he's pitted against Stryker and Creed in 1983, having adamantium grafted to his bones. Taking the name "Wolverine" after the Algonquian spirit Kuekuatsheu, Howlett works together with Creed to fight and kill Weapon XI, after which Stryker shoots Howlett in the brain with adamantium bullets before being arrested. Though he survives, his memory is lost, with his only identifying personal effects being his dog tags.

Member of the X-Men 

Years later, in the early 2000s, Logan is an amateur cage fighter in Laughlin City, Alberta. There Logan meets Marie "Rogue" D'Ancanto, a mutant teenage girl who has run away from home. They are attacked on the road by Victor Creed, now known as Sabretooth and a minion of Magneto. Two of Xavier's studentsCyclops and Stormarrive and save them. Logan and Rogue are brought to Xavier's mansion and school for mutants in Westchester County, New York. Xavier tells Logan that Magneto appears to have taken an interest in him and asks him to stay while Xavier's mutants, the X-Men, investigate. Rogue enrolls in the school, and visits Logan while he is having a nightmare. Startled, he accidentally stabs her, but she is able to absorb his healing ability to recover. Disturbed by this event, Rogue leaves the school, and Logan finds her on a train and convinces her to return. Before they can leave, Magneto arrives, knocks out Logan and subdues Rogue, revealing it was Rogue who he wants rather than Logan. Learning that Magneto plans to use a machine to "mutate" world leaders meeting at a summit on nearby Ellis Island, Logan and the other X-Men scale the Statue of Liberty, battling and overpowering the Brotherhood of Mutants, with Logan throwing Sabretooth off of the building into the ocean. After helping stop Magneto's plan, Logan is directed by Professor X to an abandoned military base around Alkali Lake that might contain information about his past, taking Cyclops' motorcycle.

Four days later, while stopping on his way to Alkali Lake to refill his gas tank, Logan notices that Sabretooth has been tracking him and attacks him, stopping after noticing him to have similar dog tags to his own, and that Sabretooth is not trying to kill him. Offering him a drink, the two drink in a nearby bar, with Sabretooth revealing his fall from the Statue of Liberty to have restored some of his own erased memories, of his name being "Victor", of killing babies and old men, and of Logan. They are interrupted by soldiers searching for Victor, who recognizes Logan as "Weapon X". Fighting the soldiers, Logan and Victor are surprised that they show instinctive teamwork side-by-side, but they are eventually brought down. The two wake up restrained on a helicopter, and after apologizing to Logan for their past, having remembered them to be brothers, Victor throws Logan out of it, sacrificing himself to save him. William Stryker then has adamantium bonded to Victor's bones, which fails as he had originally expected, although he is content with one new success story, Lady Deathstrike. Learning of Logan's survival, Stryker expects to see "Wolverine" again.

Three days later after that, Logan returns to Professor X's school for mutants where he encounters Stryker, to which he and the X-Men teams up with Magneto and Mystique to stop him. During a confrontation with Stryker and Lady Deathstrike, Logan regains some of his memory but opts to remain with the X-Men over Stryker's objections, while Stryker is killed when Alkali's base floods after sustaining damage.

A few years later, Xavier sends Logan and Storm to investigate the disappearance of Scott Summers at Alkali Lake, but they find only telekinetically floating rocks, Summers' glasses, and an unconscious Jean. Xavier explains to Logan that when Jean sacrificed herself to save them, she freed the "Phoenix", a dark and extremely powerful alternate personality which Xavier had telepathically repressed. Logan is disgusted to learn of this psychic tampering with Jean's mind but, once she awakens, he discovers that she killed Summers and is not the Jean Grey he once knew. Jean kills Xavier and joins Magneto, who plans to have mutants loyal to him storm a Worthington Labs facility housed in Alcatraz to destroy a supposed "cure" for mutants. Logan, Storm, and Beast lead the remaining X-Men in challenging the attack, and Logan has Colossus throw him at Magneto to distract him long enough for Hank McCoy to inject Magneto with the "cure" and thus nullify his powers. Army reinforcements arrive and shoot at Jean just as Logan had calmed her down. The Phoenix is awakened by the attack and disintegrates the troops, and begins to destroy Alcatraz and anyone within range of her powers. Logan realizes that only he can stop the Phoenix due to his healing factor and adamantium skeleton. When Logan approaches her, Jean momentarily gains control and begs him to save her, and everyone else, by killing her. Logan fatally stabs Jean, killing the Phoenix, but mourns her death.

Isolation 

Years later, the guilt-ridden Logan lives in isolation in the Yukon. He is located by Yukio, a mutant with the ability to foresee people's deaths, sent by an elderly Ichirō Yashida wanting to repay Logan for being saved during World War II, but Logan refuses to have his healing powers transferred into Yashida. With Yukio as his side, this leads to a series of events where Wolverine protects Ichirō's granddaughter, Mariko Yashida from Ichirō's son, Shingen Yashida. In the course of these events, Logan's healing powers are damaged, his adamantium claws are severed, and he is finally able to let go of his guilt over Jean's death. After finally returning to the United States two years later, Logan finds himself approached by Magneto and a resurrected Professor X while learning of a new threat to all mutants. A deleted scene shows the titular character's yellow costume from the source material in a suitcase.

Going back in time 

By 2023, the world is controlled by Sentinels, where Wolverine has teamed up with surviving mutants and the X-Men. Logan's mind is transferred back in time into his 1973 self (during the events of the opening war montage of X-Men Origins: Wolverine) to help the younger Charles and Lehnsherr, as well as Hank McCoy, deter Mystique from assassinating Bolivar Trask, preventing the apocalyptic future from occurring. Once his mission is fulfilled, the original timeline is erased.

Revised timeline

Captured by Weapon X 

In the revised timeline, although initially rescued by Mystique, the 1973 Logan is eventually captured by Stryker, given an adamantium skeleton and subjected to brutal mental conditioning, leaving him on a more feral stage than human. When some of the X-Men are captured by Stryker's men in 1983, Jean, Scott, and Nightcrawler infiltrate Stryker's base and find a cage with Jean sensing the human mind underneath and releasing him so that he can help. After he tears through Stryker's forces, the three mutants find him and Jean telepathically restores some of Logan's human memories before he runs off at a small side-exit into the snow.

Modern day 

Over the next 40 years, Logan joined the X-Men, ultimately becoming a history teacher at Xavier's School for Gifted Youngsters. In 2023, Logan's past self regains consciousness with no memory of his future self's activities wakes up in his new timeline's body to a changed future.

Logan timeline

Fall of the X-Men 
Over the course of six years in another alternate future, Logan's healing factor began to suffer severe deterioration, causing him to finally begin showing his age, due to a virus unleashed by the Alkali-Transigen corporation, weakening existing mutants and preventing any future natural mutant births. In addition, due to this decreased state of healing, he is slowly dying from adamantium poisoning. By 2028, Xavier would develop Alzheimer's as a result of the virus, and inadvertently kill several hundred people, including most of the X-Men, in a seizure-induced psychic attack in Westchester County. Logan asks the assistance of Caliban to help care for Xavier. He and Caliban would take Xavier to a place in Mexico near the U.S border, caring for him over the following year while attempting to raise money to purchase a Sunseeker yacht for the two of them to live in peace on.

Death 
In 2029, Logan spends his days working as a chauffeur under his birth name and hustling for prescription drugs along the border between the United States and Mexico. He and Caliban live in an abandoned smelting plant across the border in Mexico and care for the senile Xavier. He is tasked by Transigen's former nurse Gabriela Lopez to escort the 11-year-old Laura to a place in North Dakota called "Eden." Logan, Charles and Laura escape Transigen's hunters led by Donald Pierce and discover that Laura is Logan's daughter bred from his DNA. After accepting shelter from the Munson family they helped on the highway, Xavier is killed by a feral clone of Wolverine from which Logan and Laura escape and bury Xavier's body near a lake.

Eventually, Logan and Laura arrive at Eden, a safe haven run by Rictor and former Transigen test subjects. There, Logan learns that the children will make an eight-mile journey across the forest to the Canadian-American border and entrusts Laura to lead before departing on his own. But when the children are located and captured, Logan uses a mutant serum provided by Rictor to restore his strength and healing factor. He meets Zander Rice, killing the mutant virus' creator. Despite Rice and Pierce being killed, Logan is no match for his clone, who impales Logan through a tree with his healing factor now gone. Laura shoots the clone in the head with an adamantium bullet that Logan had kept with him for years. Logan tells Laura not to become the weapon that she was made to be, and after she tearfully acknowledges him as her father, he dies peacefully in her arms. Laura and the children bury him before continuing the journey across the border. Laura places the cross on his grave on its side to create an "X" to honor him as the last of the X-Men.

Background and creation

Initial character creation 
In the 1970s, Marvel editor-in-chief Roy Thomas asked writer Len Wein to devise a character specifically named Wolverine, who is Canadian and of small stature and with a wolverine's fierce temper. John Romita Sr. designed the first Wolverine costume, and believes he introduced the retractable claws, saying, "When I make a design, I want it to be practical and functional. I thought, 'If a man has claws like that, how does he scratch his nose or tie his shoelaces?'" Wolverine first appeared in the final "teaser" panel of The Incredible Hulk #180 (cover-dated Oct. 1974) written by Wein and penciled by Herb Trimpe. The character then appeared in a number of advertisements in various Marvel Comics publications before making his first major appearance in The Incredible Hulk #181 (Nov. 1974) again by the Wein–Trimpe team. In 2009, Trimpe said he "distinctly remembers" Romita's sketch and that, "The way I see it, [Romita and Wein] sewed the monster together and I shocked it to life!... It was just one of those secondary or tertiary characters, actually, that we were using in that particular book with no particular notion of it going anywhere. We did characters in The [Incredible] Hulk all the time that were in [particular] issues and that was the end of them."

In 1975's Giant-Size X-Men #1, written by Wein and penciled by Dave Cockrum, Wolverine is recruited for a new squad. Gil Kane illustrated the cover artwork but incorrectly drew Wolverine's mask with larger headpieces. Dave Cockrum liked Kane's accidental alteration (he thought the original was too similar to Batman's mask) and incorporated it into his own artwork for the actual story. Cockrum was also the first artist to draw Wolverine without his mask, and the distinctive hairstyle became a trademark of the character. A revival of X-Men followed, beginning with X-Men #94 (August 1975), drawn by Cockrum and written by Chris Claremont. In X-Men and Uncanny X-Men, Wolverine is initially overshadowed by the other characters, although he does create tension in the team as he is attracted to Cyclops' girlfriend, Jean Grey. As the series progressed, Claremont and Cockrum (who preferred Nightcrawler) considered dropping Wolverine from the series; Cockrum's successor, artist John Byrne, championed the character, later explaining, as a Canadian himself, he did not want to see a Canadian character dropped. Byrne modeled his rendition of Wolverine on actor Paul D'Amato, who played Dr. Hook in the 1977 sports film Slap Shot.

Early efforts to transition to film 
Marvel Comics writers and chief editors Gerry Conway and Roy Thomas wrote an X-Men screenplay in 1984 when Orion Pictures held an option on the film rights, but development stalled when Orion began facing financial troubles. Throughout 1989 and 1990, Stan Lee and Chris Claremont were in discussions with Carolco Pictures for an X-Men film adaptation, with James Cameron as producer and Kathryn Bigelow directing. A story treatment was written by Bigelow, with Bob Hoskins being considered for Wolverine and Angela Bassett being considered for the role of Storm. The deal fell apart when Stan Lee piqued Cameron's interest on a Spider-Man film. Carolco went bankrupt, and the film rights reverted to Marvel. In December 1992, Marvel discussed selling the property to Columbia Pictures to no avail. Meanwhile, Avi Arad produced the animated X-Men TV series for Fox Kids. 20th Century Fox was impressed by the success of the TV show, and producer Lauren Shuler Donner purchased the film rights for them in 1994, bringing Andrew Kevin Walker to write the script.

Walker's draft involved Professor Xavier recruiting Wolverine into the X-Men, which consists of Cyclops, Jean Grey, Iceman, Beast, and Angel. The script focused on the rivalry between Wolverine and Cyclops, as well as the latter's self-doubt as a field leader. Part of the backstory invented for Magneto made him the cause of the Chernobyl disaster. The script also featured the X-Copter and the Danger Room. Walker turned in his second draft in June 1994. Laeta Kalogridis, John Logan, James Schamus, and Joss Whedon were brought on for subsequent rewrites. One of these scripts kept the idea of Magneto turning Manhattan into a "mutant homeland", while another hinged on a romance between Wolverine and Storm. Whedon's draft featured the Danger Room, and concluded with Jean Grey dressed as the Phoenix. According to Entertainment Weekly, this screenplay was rejected because of its "quick-witted pop culture-referencing tone", and the finished film contained only two dialogue exchanges that Whedon had contributed. Michael Chabon pitched a six-page film treatment to Fox in 1996. It focused heavily on character development between Wolverine and Jubilee and included Professor X, Cyclops, Jean Grey, Nightcrawler, Beast, Iceman, and Storm. Under Chabon's plan, the villains would not have been introduced until the second film.

Casting 

Many actors were considered for playing the part of Wolverine in a film adaptation of X-Men. Viggo Mortensen was offered the role but turned it down as it conflicted with another role he was scheduled for. At one point in the 1990s, Glenn Danzig was approached for the role due to a slight resemblance, however, Danzig declined as the shooting would interfere with his band's nine-month tour. Bryan Singer spoke to a number of actors, including Russell Crowe, Keanu Reeves and Edward Norton, for the role. Fox ruled out Mel Gibson as being too expensive. Though Dougray Scott was cast but was forced to drop out due scheduling conflicts with Mission Impossible 2 and was injured in a motorbike accident, the role went to Hugh Jackman. Jackman revealed in an interview with The Huffington Post that his character was originally going to have a cameo in Spider-Man. While possessing all the same powers as his comic book counterpart, this portrayal is shown to have a much more powerful healing factor, able to mend and regenerate any damage (short of decapitation) within seconds, and also rendering him ageless, being nearly twice as old as in the comics while still in his prime.

Casting directors cast Troye Sivan as the young James Howlett in X-Men Origins: Wolverine (2009) after seeing him sing at the Channel Seven Perth Telethon, and he was accepted after sending in an audition tape. Kodi Smit-McPhee was originally cast in the role, when filming was originally beginning in December 2007, but he opted out to film The Road. McPhee later played Nightcrawler in X-Men: Apocalypse and Dark Phoenix.

Characterization

Personality 
Relying on his senses and his instincts to get him around, Logan's personality comes in ranking as an ISTP according to the Myers–Briggs Type Indicator. His personage has been reviewed as a 'loner', often taking leave from the X-Men to deal with personal issues or problems. He is often irreverent and rebellious towards authority figures, although he is a reliable ally and capable leader, and has occasionally displayed a wry, sarcastic sense of humor. The character in the film had few lines, but much emotion to convey in them thus, Jackman watched Clint Eastwood in the Dirty Harry movies and Mel Gibson in Mad Max 2 as inspirations.

Appearance 
After the casting announcement, the choice of Jackman sparked criticism at first since he was considered "too tall and too handsome" to play the "short and somewhat feral Canadian". Jackman, at  stands 30 cm taller than Wolverine, who is said in the original comic book to be . Hence, the filmmakers were frequently forced to shoot Jackman at unusual angles or only from the waist up to make him appear shorter than he actually is, and his co-stars wore platform soles. Jackman was also required to add a great deal of muscle for the role, and in preparing for the films, he underwent a strict diet and exercise regime.
The scenes in the franchise in which Logan appears shirtless, in particular X-Men Origins: Wolverine (2009), have been widely noted by Jackman as the primary reason the character was established as a sex symbol. For the film, Jackman underwent a high-intensity weight training regimen to improve his physique for the role. He altered the program to shock his body into change and also performed cardiovascular workouts. Jackman noted that no digital touches were applied to his physique in a shot of him rising naked from the tank within which Logan has his bones infused with adamantium.

Speaking on why the classic comic book costume of Wolverine has never been worn onscreen, the director James Mangold believed the yellow costume has never made sense in any X-Men movie and seemed out of character, stating, 'Finding the rationale for a uniform when the character disdains self-promotion, why he would put on some outfit that promotes himself as some kind of hero? The flesh and blood character is very loyal to that iconoclastic rebel who doesn't seem to be the first to don spandex. [...] who puts a special branded outfit on when they do good deeds? And why? The only reason you do it is so you can have some sort of trademarked claim and get credit for what you did. Nothing seems less Wolverine-like than the desire to put on a trademarked outfit, particularly canary yellow, [...] Essentially, it's something that lives on the page and I'm not sure could live anywhere else.'

In other media

Film 
 Jackman has revealed in an interview with the Huffington Post that he was originally set to reprise the role of Logan in Spider-Man (2002) in a cameo appearance, but that when he showed up in New York on the set to film the scene, it couldn't be filmed as the crew was unable to get access to the Wolverine costume from X-Men (2000).
 In a deleted scene of Fantastic Four (2005), Reed Richards changes his face to resemble Jackman's portrayal of Wolverine in an attempt to woo Sue Storm; the scene was restored in the "Extended Cut" of the film.
 In Flushed Away (2006), Roddy (voiced by Jackman) is checking his wardrobe and one of the costumes is a Wolverine one.
 Vince Vieluf portrayed as a jock version of Jackman's Logan in the parody film Epic Movie (2007), spoofing elements of X-Men: The Last Stand (2006).
 Jackman has parodied the Logan role in films such as Night at the Museum: Secret of the Tomb (2014) and Me and Earl and the Dying Girl (2015), in addition to playing himself.
 When "The Farmer" is in his "Mr. X" persona in Shaun the Sheep Movie (2015), the poster in which he poses with a hair clipper in each hand is based the poster for The Wolverine (2013).
 While Logan does not appear in Deadpool (2016), both the character and Jackman are comically referenced multiple times by the title character, with a mask made from a photograph of Jackman being worn by Deadpool after the film's climax to represent Logan.
 The opening scene of The Greatest Showman (2017), also starring Jackman, features an Easter egg reference to Logan in the appearance of the characters arms crossed with claws extended, in each corner of the border surrounding cast credits.
 The opening scene of Deadpool 2 (2018) depicts Deadpool holding a music box that depicts Logan's demise in Logan. Jackman's likeness was also used in a scene where Deadpool autographs a young boy's cereal box with Jackman's face on it as "Ryan Reynolds". In a mid-credits scene, using a repaired time travel device of Cable's, Deadpool travels back in time to the climax of X-Men Origins: Wolverine to shoot Weapon XI multiple times, proclaiming of "just cleaning up the timeline" to Logan. Jackman is depicted through the use of archive footage from X-Men Origins: Wolverine.

Video games 
The video games X2: Wolverine's Revenge, X-Men: The Official Game, and X-Men Origins: Wolverine are based on the X-Men film series for which they are named, the latter two including voice acting by Hugh Jackman as Logan, with the first merely featuring Jackman's likeness with Mark Hamill voicing the character. The first game does not take place in the continuity of the film series, having a closer resemblance to the Marvel Universe instead, while the second game bridges the events of X2 and X-Men: The Last Stand, as Logan mourns Jean Grey and faces a returned Jason Stryker and Lady Deathstrike, who working with HYDRA take control of his deceased father's Sentinel to eradicate mutantkind; Logan also faces his brother Victor, who had been bonded with adamantium and mind-wiped by Stryker. The story of the third game is a combination of the backstory explored in the X-Men Origins: Wolverine film and an original plot created by Raven Software using Unreal Engine technology, which was influenced by major events in the X-Men comic series, expanding upon the film's events as Logan recalls the events of X-Men Origins: Wolverine more accurately during the post-apocalyptic future later depicted in X-Men: Days of Future Past.

Future 

During an appearance on The Dr. Oz Show in May 2015, Jackman stated that Logan (2017) would be his final portrayal as the character; he said, "This will be my last one, it is my last time. It just felt like it was the right time to do it, and let's be honest, 17 years. I never thought in a million years it would last, so I'm so grateful to the fans for the opportunity of playing it. I kind of have in my head what we're going to do in this last one. It just feels like this is the perfect way to go out." Jackman has also explained that Jerry Seinfeld has convinced him to quit the role stating, "He said to me, when you're creating something it's very important not to run yourself dry. It's not about finishing on top, necessarily, but making sure you're, creatively, still got something left, which propels you into the whatever's next."

In December 2016, Ryan Reynolds revealed that he had been trying to convince Jackman to re-sign for a Wolverine and Deadpool crossover film. Urging fans to campaign online, he stated, "I want Deadpool and Wolverine in a movie together. What we're gonna have to do is convince Hugh. If anything, I'm going to need to do what I can to get my internet friends back on board to help rally another cause down the line. Hugh Jackman is one of the best human beings. Part of the reason I want to do a Deadpool/Wolverine movie is not just because I think the two would light the screen on fire but I genuinely love the guy." In January 2017, Reynolds and Jackman spoke about the proposed project; Jackman stated, "I'm hesitating, because I could totally see how that's the perfect fit. But the timing may be wrong." Jackman later stated that he would not reprise the role for a team-up film, specifying, "No, and Ryan is currently sleeping outside my house. [Laughs] Look, if that movie had appeared 10 years ago, probably a different story, but I knew two-and-a-half years ago that this was the last one. The first call I made was to [director James Mangold]. I said, 'Jim, I got one more shot at this,' and as soon as Jim came up with the idea and we worked on it, I was never more excited. But, it feels like the right time. Deadpool, go for it man, do your thing. You don't need me."

Jackman expressed interest in continuing to play Wolverine if the character been brought into the Marvel Cinematic Universe. Jackman elaborated, "If that was on the table when I made my decision, it certainly would have made me pause. That's for sure. Because I always love the idea of him within that dynamic, with the Hulk obviously, with Iron Man but there's a lot of smarter people with MBAs who can't figure that out. You never know. At the moment, honestly, if I really did have them there, I probably wouldn't have said this is the last. It just feels like this is the right time [to leave the character]." Prior to Disney's prospective acquisition of 20th Century Fox's film division, a sequel to Logan, tentatively titled Laura, was confirmed to be in an active state of development, featuring Dafne Keen reprising her role as Laura, Logan's daughter, with Jackman to be featured via archive footage. In July 2021, Jackman posted an image of Wolverine's arm and claws on Instagram, followed by a picture of himself with Marvel Studios head Kevin Feige, setting off speculation that Jackman would return as Wolverine in an upcoming MCU film. However, Jackman later revealed that he was merely sharing fan art and had not foreseen that his post would "break the internet".

On September 27, 2022, Marvel Studios and Ryan Reynolds announced that Jackman would be returning to reprise the role in the upcoming Deadpool 3 (2024), set in the Marvel Cinematic Universe (MCU).

Reception and legacy 
The character from the X-Men film series was well received by critics. Daniel Dockery of Syfy ranked Wolverine 1st in their "Ranking Every Mutant in the X-Men Film Series" list, writing, "For nearly 20 years, we got to see Wolverine from every angle, and by the end of Logan, the sadness in his demise was truly earned." IndieWire ranked Wolverine 2nd in their "X-Men Movie Mutant Characters From Best To Worst" list. The A.V. Club ranked Wolverine 6th in their "100 best Marvel characters" list. Joe Garza of Slashfilm ranked Wolverine 7th in their "Most Powerful X-Men Characters" list.

Hugh Jackman's portrayal of the character has been praised by multiple critics. Jessica Brajer of MovieWeb stated, "The film that kick-started the X-Men franchise and brought Jackman into the spotlight is the original X-Men. [...] Though Jackman wasn't the first choice for the role, it's clear that he has lived up to the expectations set by comic-book fans everywhere." Liam Gaughan of Slashfilm wrote, "If a new actor is cast as Wolverine in a rebooted X-Men franchise within the Marvel Cinematic Universe, they will have to live up to the legacy that Jackman left behind." Christian Bone of Starburst ranked Jackman's performances through the X-Men films 1st in their "10 Greatest Performances in the X-Men Movies" list, saying, "Some might complain that Wolverine hogs too much of the spotlight at the expense of other characters, but it’s hard to blame the filmmakers for this when Jackman is such a strong leading man. Even now, in our superhero-saturated world, his Wolverine remains unique - a reluctant hero, who struggles to control his own brutality. It’s the sort of character you don’t really get in the MCU, though he no doubt will be folded into it soon enough. Good luck to the poor sap who has to follow Jackman." Scoot Allan of CBR.com ranked Jackman's performances across the X-Men film series 3rd in their "10 Best Performances In The X-Men Movies" list, writing, "Hugh Jackman played the mutant hero and became an instant hit with fans of Wolverine." Jackman's performance topped The Hollywood Reporters "50 Greatest Superhero Movie Performances of All Time" list.

Playing the role for 17 years in nine films, Jackman held the Guinness World Record of 'longest career as a live-action Marvel superhero', although this was later surpassed in December 2021 when Tobey Maguire, Willem Dafoe, and J.K. Simmons reprised their roles of Peter Parker / Spider-Man, Norman Osborn / Green Goblin, and J. Jonah Jameson, respectively in the Marvel Cinematic Universe film Spider-Man: No Way Home (2021), and again by Patrick Stewart reprising his role in the MCU film Doctor Strange in the Multiverse of Madness (2022).

Accolades

Notes

References

External links 

Canadian superheroes
Fictional American Civil War veterans
Fictional assassins
Fictional Canadian Army personnel
Fictional Canadian secret agents
Fictional characters from Alberta
Fictional characters with amnesia
Fictional characters with neurotrauma
Fictional characters with slowed ageing
Fictional characters with superhuman senses
Fictional chauffeurs
Fictional fist-load fighters
Fictional Korean War veterans
Fictional mercenaries
Fictional patricides
Fictional prisoners of war
Fictional schoolteachers
Fictional super soldiers
Fictional Union Army personnel
Fictional United States Army Special Forces personnel
Fictional Vietnam War veterans
Fictional vigilantes
Fictional World War I veterans
Fictional World War II veterans
Fictional characters with post-traumatic stress disorder
Film characters introduced in 2000
Male characters in film
Marvel Cinematic Universe characters
Marvel Comics characters with accelerated healing
Marvel Comics film characters
Marvel Comics military personnel
Marvel Comics mutants
Orphan characters in film
Wolverine (film series)
Wolverine (comics)
X-Men (film series) characters
X-Men members
Fictional people from the 19th-century